James Samuel Carroll (born May 6, 1943) is a former American football linebacker in the National Football League for the New York Giants, the Washington Redskins, and the New York Jets.  He played college football at the University of Notre Dame and was drafted in the twelfth round of the 1965 NFL Draft.

At Notre Dame, Carroll was team captain and won All-America honors.  He played in a total of 61 NFL games during his five-year career.

References

External links

Jim Carroll at Notre Dame website

1943 births
Living people
Notre Dame Fighting Irish football players
American football linebackers
New York Giants players
Washington Redskins players
New York Jets players